An abaton is a sacred place, which is not accessible to most people; usually in reference to a monastery.

Abaton may also refer to:

 Adyton, an inaccessible religious building (or part of a building)
A building at the Asclepion in Epidaurus
A temple on the island of Bigeh, in the Nile river
A monument erected by Artemisia II of Caria after the conquest of Rhodes
Abaton (album), a 2003 album by pianist Sylvie Courvoisier
Abaton, a 2017 film from Nathaniel Dorsky's Arboretum Cycle